Maria Vivoree Niña Matutes Esclito (born August 3, 2000), professionally known as Vivoree, is a Filipino singer, actress, television personality and model. She came to prominence after joining Pinoy Big Brother: Lucky 7 for which she finished 6th among the Teens and 21st Overall and was dubbed "Go Getter Girl Ng Bohol".

Early life and education
Maria Vivoree Niña Matutes Esclito is the eldest of three to a public school teacher mom and a seafarer dad. She was born in August 3, 2000 in Loon, Bohol, Philippines. She attended Tagbilaran City Science High School for her junior high school. In May 2020, Esclito graduated from senior high school under a homeschool program by the Catholic Filipino Academy and was given two awards, the "Character Award: Generosity” and the “Academic Award: Philippine Politics and Governance”.

Career

2016–2018: Pinoy Big Brother, Kaya Pa, and Signing with Star Magic 
In 2016, Vivoree auditioned for the Philippine reality television show Pinoy Big Brother: Lucky 7 when it was announced that the show would be holding auditions for the first time ever in her hometown. On August 3, 2016, her 16th birthday, Vivoree was officially introduced as a housemate with the moniker "Go Getter Girl Ng Bohol". On the same day, she appeared on Tonight with Boy Abunda where she told the late-night talk show host Boy Abunda that the opportunity that she'd been given was something she had always aspired to have. On August 4, 2016, Vivoree also appeared on Pinoy Big Brother Online, three days before entering the famed Pinoy Big Brother house.

During the kickoff of the Pinoy Big Brother: Lucky 7, the teen housemates were noticeably surprised when she was introduced. The then 16-year old girl had excessive body hair which was particularly noticeable on her upper lip which gives off a masculine look(hirsutism). Vivoree underwent a total makeover after displaying leadership skills during the week’s “Pak Salern” task.

On October 22, 2016, Vivoree ended her Pinoy Big Brother Journey at 6th place among the teen housemates through eviction by audience votes.

On November 28, 2016, Vivoree released her first self-written single "Kaya Pa" under Star Music which she sang in the #PBBSwerteenBall episode with singer JK Labajo for a task.

Months after attending workshops and guesting on several talk shows, Vivoree finally signed a contract under Star Magic on March 8, 2017 together with Pinoy Big Brother: Lucky 7 Teens Maymay Entrata, Edward Barber, Kisses Delavin, Christian Morones, Yong Muhajil and Marco Gallo.

In the same year, Vivoree made her acting debut on her first television role as Cherry on Maalala Mo Kaya with Maris Racal and Inigo Pascual ", followed by her appearance onIpaglaban Mo episode titled "Kulam" as Jill, antagonist to Sharlene San Pedro's character.

2018 marked the blossoming of Vivoree's acting career as she was cast on her first major regular television drama series role in Since I Found You as AJ Punzalan, younger sibling of Janice Punzalan (Alessandra De Rossi). Vivoree landed her first lead role as Monica on Wansapanataym: ManiKEN ni Monica. She was also cast on Asintado, and appeared on Ipaglaban Mo and Maaalaala Mo Kaya episodes. Vivoree was cast on her first movie Petmalu, and made a cameo on the Metro Manila Film Festival horror film entry Otlum as well.

Aside from her acting works and tv appearances, Vivoree also had her first endorsement contract and commercial film with TNT which made it to Top 10 YouTube Ads Leaderboard in 2018.

2019–2020: CK & Vivoree, Hello Stranger and signing with Rise Artists Studio 
In 2019, Vivoree appeared on Maalaala Mo Kaya episode Choir as Jenny opposite to Charles Kieron who plays Janluis. This was Vivoree's first leading role in the said renowned and multi-awarded longest-running drama anthology which earned her praises for her acting, even being called a dramatic revelation who made a natural, well-internalized and deeply felt portrayal of a young woman learning and accepting the hurtful realities of love. Netizens were also impressed as the episode trended on Twitter Philippines and worldwide.

On January 25, 2019 Vivoree released a collaboration digital album with Charles Kieron called CK & Vivoree which debuted at 7th spot and peaked at 2nd on iTunes Philippines album Chart at the time of release. CK & Vivoree’s Grand Album Launch was also held on the same day to commemorate the release of the album at SM City Skydome attended by fans, celebrities and media.

In the same year, Vivoree was also cast as Mildred Dimalanta in the gothic-horror television drama The Killer Bride starring Maja Salvador, Janella Salvador, Joshua Garcia and Geoff Eigenmann. It is notable that Vivoree's name and character most of the time trended real-time on Twitter Philippines alongside the show's official hashtag as speculations about her character in the drama arise.

Vivoree also made an appearance on Regine Velasquez's empowering music video for her single "I am Beautiful" released on March 29th of the same year on Women's Month. Other notable cameos include Nadine Lustre and Georcelle Dapat-Sy.

In 2020, Vivoree was among the roster of pioneer stars signed under Rise Artists Studio, a training and management subsidiary of ABS-CBN Films, in collaboration with Star Magic responsible for scouting and developing aspiring artists, as well as maintaining the stardom of the artists it handles. The contract signing was held on February 6, 2020.

Vivoree then appeared on Maalaala Mo Kaya episode "Ilog" in which she played the younger counterpart of Elvira (Vina Morales). This appearance yet again created a buzz among netizens as she reunited with former onscreen partner JC Alcantara, and has earned praises for Vivoree's improved acting alongside veteran Marissa Delgado.

On June 14, 2020, Black Sheep Productions, a division of ABS-CBN Films, previewed a teaser about their launching their first boys' love series at the height of the popularity of 2gether: The Series, a Thai boys' love series. Vivoree was announced to be a part of the cast and was later revealed to be playing the role Kookai Yambao, a friend of Mico Ramos played by JC Alcantara, she harbors unrequited feelings for the latter.

Adapting to the new normal work modality, Rise Artists Studio launched its online format talk show on June 22, 2020 wherein Rise Artists interview different personalities via Zoom format. It was aired on Rise Artists Studio's Official YouTube channel and then aired on Kapamilya Channel and Kapamilya Online Live under Yes Weekend! block from May 30, 2021 to January 30, 2022.

2021–present: Hello Stranger: The Movie, Your Face Sounds Familiar, Hosting debut 
Following the huge success of Hello Stranger, a full-length film sequel to the was announced by its lead actors during the digital fan conference on August 16, 2020. The film sequel wherein Vivoree reprised her role as Kookai Yambao was then released on February 12, 2021 on KTX, iWantTFC, TFC IPTV PPV, Sky Cable PPV and Cignal PPV.

On February 4, 2021, it was revealed that Vivoree is a participating performer for Your Face Sounds Familiar with the moniker "The Rising Sweetheart". As part of promotion for the show, Vivoree appeared on It's Showtime for the segment Hide and Sing where she was the guest celebrity singer. In May 2021, Vivoree emerged as the third placer for the third season of the show.

In the same year, Vivoree appeared as Ysay Baylon, main cast, in the most-awaited teen romantic comedy television series He's Into Her based on the 2012 novel of the same name by Maxinejiji (Maxine Lat Calibuso), starring Donny Pangilinan and Belle Mariano which aired its first episode on May 28, 2021.

On October 1, 2021 Vivoree made her first appearance in the religious, crime, thriller drama television series Huwag Kang Mangamba as Freya Salvador, which yet again showcased a new side of Vivoree as an actress and gained positive response from the audience.

The success of He's Into Her series led the cast to hold an equally successful online concert where it was announced that the series is getting its second season which aired on April 22, 2022. The cast ensemble then held an offline concert He's Into Her: All Access at the Smart Araneta Coliseum on August 27, 2022.

Filmography

Online/Digital

Movies

Television

Documentaries

Music videos

Endorsements

Discography

Albums

Singles

Awards and nominations

References

External links 
 

Pinoy Big Brother contestants
Visayan people
21st-century Filipino women singers
2000 births
Living people
Star Magic
ABS-CBN personalities
Filipino film actresses
Filipino television actresses
Filipino female models